Caldey Lighthouse is located on the south end of Caldey Island, three miles (5 km) off the south Pembrokeshire, Wales coastline, a small island inhabited by a Cistercian monastery.

Construction and dimensions
An application to build the Lighthouse was made in March 1827 on behalf of traders in Carmarthen Bay. It was commissioned by Trinity House and built by Joseph Nelson at a cost of £4,460. The light was first lit in 1829.

The light stands 64 m (210 ft) above high-water mark. The former oil store for the lighthouse is a listed structure.

Lantern and lamp

The present lantern was fitted around the middle of the nineteenth century and consisted of  20 Argand lamps and reflectors, subsequently replaced by a helical lantern later in the nineteenth century.

The Lighthouse was converted to automatic operations in 1929. It was the last Trinity House lighthouse to be powered by gas, eventually being converted to electricity in 1997.

The light was intended to help coastal traffic trading limestone and coal to mid and north Wales but the light also helped long-distance and north American traffic identify the Bristol Channel and avoid confusion with the English Channel.

Keeper's cottages
The lighthouse keepers'  cottages, that flank the Lighthouse, are two-storey, with hipped roofs, octagonal chimneys, and a one-storey linking corridor. This forms a ‘U’-shape, with the Lighthouse at the centre of the south side, and enclosed gardens to the north. The cottages were built around 1868-70 by T. C. Harvey, C.E.

In art
Cardiff Central Library holds a wash drawing by Charles Norris showing the Lighthouse under construction.

See also

 List of lighthouses in Wales
 Trinity House

References

Sources
Hague, D. B., Lighthouses of Wales Their Architecture and Archaeology (Royal Commission on the Ancient and Historical Monuments of Wales, 1994), 
Lloyd, T., Orbach, J., Scourfield, R., The Buildings of Wales: Pembrokeshire (Yale University Press, 2004), .

External links

 Trinity House

Lighthouses completed in 1828
Lighthouses in Pembrokeshire